The 2016 Western & Southern Open  was a men's and women's tennis tournament played on outdoor hard courts from August 15–21, 2016. It was a Masters 1000 tournament on the 2016 ATP World Tour and a WTA Premier 5 tournament on the 2016 WTA Tour. The tournament was one of two headline events in the 2016 US Open Series. The 2016 tournament was the 115th men's edition and the 88th women's edition of the Cincinnati Masters. The tournament is held annually at the Lindner Family Tennis Center in Mason (a northern suburb of Cincinnati), Ohio, United States.

Roger Federer and Serena Williams were the two-time defending champions in Men's and Women's singles titles, but neither of them defended their titles. They withdrew due to a knee injury and shoulder inflammation, respectively.

Points and prize money

Point distribution

Prize money

ATP singles main-draw entrants

Seeds

 Rankings are as of August 8, 2016

Other entrants
The following players received wild cards into the main singles draw:
  Jared Donaldson
  Taylor Fritz
  Reilly Opelka
  Fernando Verdasco

The following players received entry using a protected ranking into the main draw:
  Julien Benneteau
  Juan Mónaco

The following players received entry from the singles qualifying draw:
  Nikoloz Basilashvili
  Malek Jaziri
  John Millman
  Yūichi Sugita
  Jiří Veselý
  Mikhail Youzhny
  Mischa Zverev

The following player received entry as a lucky loser:
  Adrian Mannarino

Withdrawals
Before the tournament
  Novak Djokovic (wrist injury) →replaced by  Andreas Seppi
  Roger Federer (rehabilitation from knee injury) →replaced by  Vasek Pospisil
  Philipp Kohlschreiber →replaced by  Pablo Carreño Busta
  Andrey Kuznetsov →replaced by  Nicolás Almagro
  Gilles Müller →replaced by  Nicolas Mahut
  Jack Sock →replaced by  Borna Ćorić
  Janko Tipsarević (fatigue) →replaced by  Adrian Mannarino

During the tournament
  Gaël Monfils (back injury)

Retirements
  Borna Ćorić
  Alexandr Dolgopolov (back injury)

ATP doubles main-draw entrants

Seeds

 Rankings are as of August 8, 2016

Other entrants
The following pairs received wildcards into the doubles main draw:
  Brian Baker /  Ryan Harrison
  Eric Butorac /  Taylor Fritz

Withdrawals
Before the tournament
  Sam Querrey (back injury)
  Stan Wawrinka (illness)

During the tournament
  Milos Raonic (illness)

WTA singles main-draw entrants

Seeds

 Rankings are as of August 8, 2016

Other entrants
The following players received wild cards into the main singles draw:
  Louisa Chirico
  Christina McHale
  Serena Williams (Withdrew due to shoulder injury)

The following players received entry from the singles qualifying draw:
  Tímea Babos
  Annika Beck
  Kateryna Bondarenko
  Eugenie Bouchard
  Alizé Cornet
  Varvara Flink
  Daria Gavrilova
  Kurumi Nara
  Alison Riske
  Donna Vekić
  Zhang Shuai
  Zheng Saisai

The following players received entry as lucky losers:
  Misaki Doi
  Viktorija Golubic
  Johanna Larsson
  Tsvetana Pironkova

Withdrawals
Before the tournament
  Jelena Janković → replaced by  Anna Karolína Schmiedlová
  Petra Kvitová (right leg injury) → replaced by  Viktorija Golubic
  Ekaterina Makarova (change of schedule) → replaced by  Johanna Larsson
  Monica Puig (lower back) → replaced by  Tsvetana Pironkova
  Sloane Stephens → replaced by  Lesia Tsurenko
  Serena Williams → replaced by  Misaki Doi

Retirements
  Alizé Cornet

WTA doubles main-draw entrants

Seeds

 Rankings are as of August 8, 2016

Other entrants
The following pairs received wildcards into the doubles main draw:
  Belinda Bencic /  Kirsten Flipkens
  Lauren Davis /  Varvara Lepchenko
  Daria Gavrilova /  Daria Kasatkina

Withdrawals
During the tournament
  Kiki Bertens (illness)
  Carla Suárez Navarro (left leg injury)

Finals

Men's singles

  Marin Čilić defeated  Andy Murray, 6–4, 7–5

Women's singles

  Karolína Plíšková defeated  Angelique Kerber, 6–3, 6–1

Men's doubles

  Ivan Dodig /  Marcelo Melo defeated  Jean-Julien Rojer /  Horia Tecău, 7–6(7–5), 6–7(5–7), [10–6]

Women's doubles

  Sania Mirza /  Barbora Strýcová defeated  Martina Hingis /  CoCo Vandeweghe, 7–5, 6–4

References

External links
 

 
2016 ATP World Tour
2016 WTA Tour
2016
Cincinn